Tilia hupehensis, the Hubei lime, is a species of flowering plant in the family Malvaceae.

References

hupehensis
Flora of China
Plants described in 1982